Elberta may refer to a location in the United States:

 Elberta, Alabama, a town
 Elberta, Georgia, an unincorporated place
 Elberta, Michigan, a village
 Elberta, Pennsylvania, a census-designated place
 Elberta, Texas, an unincorporated community
 Elberta, Utah, a census-designated place

Other uses
"Elberta", a type of peach